Mercer High School or Mercer County High School may refer to:

 Mercer County High School (Illinois), in Aledo, Illinois — formed by the merger of Aledo High School and Westmer High School in 2009 and uses the team name "the Golden Eagles"
 Mercer County Senior High School (Kentucky) in Harrodsburg, Kentucky — formed by the merger of Harrodsburg High School and Mercer County High School in 2006 and uses the team name "the Titans"
 Mercer High School (Missouri), in Mercer, Mercer County, Missouri — operated by the North Mercer R-III School District, and uses the team name "the Cardinals"
 Mercer County Junior-Senior High School (New Jersey), also known Mercer Junior Senior High School, in Hamilton, Mercer County, New Jersey — operated by Mercer County Special Services School District
 Mercer County Performing Arts High School in Trenton, Mercer County, New Jersey — operated by the Mercer County Technical School District
 Mercer High School (Tennessee) in Mercer, Madison County, Tennessee — merged to form South Side High School in Jackson, Tennessee in 1956
 Mercer Area Middle-High School, also known as Mercer Area Junior/Senior High School, in Mercer, Mercer County, Pennsylvania — uses the team name "the Mustangs"
 Mercer Island High School in Mercer Island, King County, Washington — uses the team name "the Islanders"
 Mercer School (Wisconsin) in Mercer, Iron County, Wisconsin — includes Mercer Environmental Tourism Charter School and other high school, and uses the team name "the Tigers"